Ad Mania is a 2011 Chinese modern serial drama starring Hong Kong actors Joe Ma and Raymond Lam. Filming began in Shanghai on 27 September 2010. and premiered on Chongqing Entertainment Channel on 17 November 2011 but only  till to chapter 2. It re-premiered on 5 OCT, 2013.

Cast

Li Tian Ad Company

Yi Wei Ad Company

Other cast

References

Television shows set in Shanghai
Serial drama television series
Chinese romance television series
2013 Chinese television series debuts
Television shows filmed in Shanghai